Michael Jay Wildes (born November 27, 1964) is an American immigration lawyer and politician who serves as the 38th and current Mayor of Englewood, New Jersey. He previously served as the 36th Mayor of Englewood from 2004 to 2010. A member of the Democratic Party, Wildes served as a Federal Prosecutor for the  Eastern District of New York and as a City Councilman for Englewood before he was elected mayor in 2003. He was reelected in 2006 and again in 2018. A nationally recognized authority on American immigration law, Wildes has had success in defending the immigration rights of his clients, some of whom are celebrities. Wildes is the managing partner of the law firm Wildes and Weinberg PC. He also serves as immigration counsel to Davidoff Hutcher and Citron LLP, and Lincoln Center for the Performing Arts.

Ancestry
Wildes' paternal grandfather, Harry Wildes, was a retail store owner who immigrated to the United States from Białystok, Poland, in 1920. His maternal grandfather, Max Schoenwalter, owned a paint company and escaped Nazi Germany in the late 1930s to immigrate to the United States. Schoenwalter was instrumental in the creation of the Queens Jewish Center.

Wildes' mother, Ruth Schoenwalter Wildes, was a prominent member of the Jewish community in Forest Hills, New York, where she lived and raised her family. She reportedly inspired the creation of the Manhattan Jewish Experience (MJE), which was established in her memory. MJE hosts the annual Ruth B. Wildes Memorial Lecture on her yahrtzeit (Jewish anniversary of her passing). The memorial lecture has been given by Jonathan Sacks, Alan Dershowitz, Meir Soloveichik, Jacob J. Schacter, Norman Lamm, Adin Steinsaltz, Shlomo Riskin, Malcolm Hoenlein, and several other notable speakers. Ruth Wildes died of breast cancer in 1995.

Wildes' father, Leon Wildes, is an American Jewish lawyer who was born and raised in Olyphant, Pennsylvania. He studied the Bible at Yeshiva College, where he obtained a bachelor's degree with magna cum laude honors. He was awarded both a J.D. and an LL.M from NYU Law School and went on to open his own law firm, Wildes and Weinberg PC, in 1960.

Leon Wildes attracted worldwide fame in 1972 when he successfully defended John Lennon and Yoko Ono from a deportation attempt by the US government. In 2016, Leon Wildes wrote a book, John Lennon vs. The USA, which recounted the details of the Lennon case. Michael wrote the book's foreword. He is also a longtime professor of law at Benjamin N. Cardozo School of Law.

Biography
Wildes was born on November 27, 1964, at Mount Sinai Hospital in New York City. He was raised in Forest Hills, Queens.

Wildes is a graduate of Queens College of the City University of New York and the Benjamin N. Cardozo School of Law, where he currently teaches immigration law as an adjunct professor. A community activist since the age of 14, Wildes was an auxiliary police officer with the New York Police Department from 1982 to 1992, during which time he was also a member of Community Board 6, a member of the Local Claims and Adjudication Board of New York State, and a candidate for Democratic District Leader of the 28th Assembly District of New York State.

In 1989, he became a federal prosecutor for the United States Attorney's Office, where he participated in several high-profile cases, including a corruption case involving former U.S. Congressman Mario Biaggi.

In 1993, Wildes joined the law firm Wildes and Weinberg PC, where he represented several defectors who had provided difficult to obtain national security information to the United States, as well as high-profile immigrant parents who had been separated from their children. Wildes also obtained visas, green cards, and helped navigate the naturalization process for his foreign clients, including artists, athletes, models, and businesspeople.

In 1998, Wildes was elected to the Englewood, New Jersey City Council, serving two terms until 2003. He testified in front of Congress about anti-terrorism legislation in 1999, at the request of U.S. Representative Rob Andrews. In 2003, Wildes ran for Mayor of the City of Englewood, New Jersey, a position he held for two terms from 2004 to 2010.

Wildes was raised in a high-achieving Modern Orthodox Jewish home in the Jewish tradition of tikkun olam (Hebrew: , "fixing the world"). His brother, Mark, is a Rabbi.

Wildes began volunteering with his local chevra kadisha (Aramaic: חברא קדישא, "holy society"), a group of men and women who ensure that dead bodies are properly buried according to Jewish law, when he was 14. He interned with Congressman Gary Ackerman and Congresswoman Geraldine Ferraro when he was 18.

Education and NYPD

Wildes received a B.A. magne cum laude in political science from Queens College of the City University of New York in January 1986, and earned a J.D. from the Benjamin N. Cardozo School of Law in June 1989. As an undergraduate at Queens College, Wildes was awarded honors in political science from the Queen's College Division of Social Sciences, and was elected to Pi Sigma Alpha (a national political science honors society). He also made the Dean's list. His State Bar Admissions include New York, New Jersey, and Washington D.C.

Wildes served with the New York Police Department as an auxiliary police officer from 1982 to 1992, serving throughout his time as a law student and member of Community Board 6. As a member of the 112th NYPD precinct, he lectured on crime prevention and public safety in New York homes and community centers. In 1991, he resigned from the NYPD.

He is a known expert on security issues and has served as a consultant for government agencies and institutions, including Homeland Security.

Law career

US Attorney's Office
Wildes served with the United States Attorney's Office in Brooklyn from 1989 to 1993 and testified on Capitol Hill in connection with anti-terrorism legislation. He served as a Special Assistant U.S. Attorney until he retired from the U.S. Attorney's Office in 1993 to join his father's law firm.

Biaggi case

In the late 1980s and early 1990s, Wildes was a federal prosecutor in former Congressman Mario Biaggi's corruption case. Biaggi had been attempting to avoid paying an $872,000 corruption fine, and would not reveal where he was hiding the money he had made after getting out of jail in 1992. Biaggi claimed the government was harassing him and refused to speak about his finances without being guaranteed immunity.

In response to the harassment claim, Wildes told the New York Post, "There is certainly no harassment involved here. As a part of his criminal sentence, Mr. Biaggi was ordered to pay a fine. The government seeks to collect this fine."

Wildes and Weinberg PC
Wildes joined Wildes and Weinberg PC, a law firm that specializes in immigration law, in 1993. He was made managing partner in 2010.

Al-Khilewi case

Early on in his career at Wildes and Weinberg, Wildes represented Mohammed al Khilewi, a high-level Saudi Arabian diplomat who sought Wildes' counsel to effectively defect to the United States in 1994. Al-Khilewi had leaked thousands of documents to the FBI that described crimes against humanity, corruption, and financial support for militant Islamic groups by the Saudi royal family, and was hunted by Saudi intelligence agents who followed him to New York after he defected. Wildes obtained political asylum for al-Khilewi, who now lives in hiding in the New York City area.

Roush case
In 1995, Wildes represented Patricia Roush, an American mother whose two daughters had been abducted and taken to Saudi Arabia by her ex-husband. Roush had married a Saudi Arabian national named Khalid Al-Gheshayan, in 1978. In 1979, Gheshayan was arrested in the United States for domestic violence (assaulting Roush and their newborn daughter), drunk driving, battery, and vandalism. He was deported to Saudi Arabia the same year. Roush divorced Gheshayan in 1985 and obtained sole custody of her daughters. However, Gheshayan protested the custody ruling in 1986 and received some visitation rights.

During his second visit with his two daughters in January 1986, Gheshayan kidnapped the two girls, then aged 7 and 3, and flew them to Saudi Arabia. Roush petitioned the United States Department of State for nine years in an attempt to bring her daughters back to America, but was ultimately unsuccessful. Wildes offered to represent Roush pro bono after he met her in 1995. Wildes negotiated a deal with Saudi diplomats that allowed Roush to visit Saudi Arabia on a visa, and allowed her to visit her children in Riyadh. U.S. marines accompanied Roush throughout her trip. She was allowed to see her children for two hours during her trip in 1995, and has not seem them since. Wildes said of the case, "Our government has given up on her plight. The American government cares more about its oil and its military agenda than its daughters. A phone call from President Clinton to King Faud would have those girls on a plane in one day. He won't do it. He and Bush and Reagan turned it over to their staffs, who do nothing but give it the runaround, writing letters, putting up a façade instead of going to the Saudi government and working out an arrangement so the girls could spend equal time here and there."

Al-Sayegh case

In 1997, Wildes represented Hani Abdel Rahim al-Sayegh, a Saudi Arabian citizen who had been wrongfully accused of involvement in the 1996 Khobar Towers bombing. In June 1996, a housing complex in Khobar, Saudi Arabia that was being used to host American military personnel was destroyed by a truck bomb, killing 19 people and injuring 498. Al-Sayegh was suspected of acting as the driver and lookout for the perpetrators of the attack. Wildes arranged for Al-Sayegh to be transferred to the United States after he was found in Canada, in 1997.

A U.S. court later sealed the fact that when Al-Sayegh was brought to the United States he made an agreement with the Federal Bureau of Investigation to plead guilty to an earlier, smaller, and unsuccessful terrorist attack, and to provide information about the Khobar Towers bombing. However, public records reveal that Al-Sayegh later told US officials that he had been in Iran during the Khobar attack and that he had no knowledge of any of the details surrounding the attack. Wildes acted as Al-Sayegh's immigration attorney. Media sources indicated that Wildes argued that Al-Sayegh had lied about his knowledge of the attacks out of fear of being deported to Saudi Arabia, where he likely would have been tortured and killed. Wildes also told The New York Times that he suspected Al-Sayegh had been given to the United States to appease American law enforcement officials who had theretofore been unable to access any Khobar bombing suspects.

In April 1997, American government officials announced they did not have sufficient evidence to extradite Al-Sayegh. As the U.S. could not charge Al-Sayegh with a crime, he was deported back to Saudi Arabia in October 1999. Al-Sayegh was to be tried in Saudi Arabia for his supposed role in the Khobar bombing but it is assumed, although unconfirmed, that he was beheaded immediately after arriving in Saudi Arabia. In 2006, a U.S. court found Iran and Hezbollah Al-Hejaz guilty of planning and carrying out the Khobar Towers bombing.

Kwame James case
In 2003, Wildes represented Kwame James, who became known as "the shoe bomber hero" after subduing Richard Reid, the perpetrator of the 2001 shoe bomb plot. Reid, a British citizen with loyalties to al-Qaeda, had boarded American Airlines Flight 63 (flying from Paris to Miami) on December 22, 2001, with an explosive device hidden in the heel of his shoe. After a flight attendant discovered Reid trying to light his shoe on fire with a match, James, a passenger on board the flight, tackled Reid and prevented him from lighting the bomb. James restrained Reid for nearly four hours while the plane flew to an emergency landing at Logan International Airport in Boston.

Although James was hailed as a hero by American media and politicians, James was not an American citizen and therefore could not remain in the United States. James, a dual citizen of Canada and Trinidad and Tobago at the time, was promised a work visa by the United States Immigration and Naturalization Service (INS), although he never received one.

Wildes represented James pro bono in 2003 and personally brought James' case to the attention of then-United States Senator Hillary Clinton (D-NY) and U.S. Representative Joseph Crowley (D-NY). Wildes criticized the US government's threat to deport James, saying, "Is this the message you want to send to someone who looked down the face of terrorism? It [is] a national disgrace". James became a legal resident of the United States in 2003 and a U.S. citizen in 2010, thus holding citizenship in three different countries.

Other notable clients and cases
 Obtained an O-1 visa for Brazilian soccer star Pelé, so Pelé could participate in the rebuilding of the New York Cosmos soccer team.
Obtained a green card for English songwriter and dancer, Sarah Brightman.
 Obtained an EB-1 green card for British singer-songwriter Craig David.
 Obtained an O-1 visa renewal for British singer-songwriter Boy George.
 Obtained full U.S. citizenship for French chef Jean-Georges.
 Obtained an O-1 visa for Rabbi Lord Jonathan Sacks, former Chief Rabbi of the United Kingdom.
 Obtained a visa for Miss Universe 2009, Stefanía Fernández, native of Venezuela.
 Obtained an O-1 visa for Israeli singer Eyal Golan.
 Obtained an O-1 visa for Israeli hip hop artist Subliminal.
 Obtained section 13 approval for Rwandan diplomat Eugène-Richard Gasana.
 Obtained an O-1 visa for Serbian tennis player Ana Ivanovic.
 Obtained a work visa for Angolan beauty queen and Miss Universe 2011 Leila Lopes.
 Obtained an O-1 visa for Gabriela Isler, a Venezuelan fashion model and winner of Miss Venezuela 2012 and Miss Universe 2013.
 Obtained an O-Visa for Jimena Navarrete, a Mexican actress and model who won Miss Universe 2010.
 Obtained a green card for Venezuelan Dayana Mendoza, winner of Miss Universe 2008.

 Obtained a green card for British singer-songwriter Chris Braide.
 Obtained an O-1 visa for British supermodel, Yasmin Le Bon.
 Obtained a green card for Canadian NASCAR driver and model, Maryeve Dufault.
 Obtained an O-1 visa for Dutch pop and jazz singer, Caro Emerald.
Obtained full US citizenship for French celebrity hairstylist, Julien Farel.
 Obtained an O-1 visa extension for Australian-Italian tenor and songwriter, Alfio.
 Obtained nearly 100 O-1 and O-2 visas for Andrew Lloyd Webber and the cast of Jesus Christ Superstar Arena Spectacular.
Obtained an O-1 visa for Israeli singer-songwriter Arkadi Duchin.
Obtained an 0-1 visa for Japanese orchestral conductor, Reona Ito.
Obtained an L-1 visa for Italian physicist Stefano Buono.
Represented Brazilian supermodel Gisele Bündchen.
Represented British tennis player Virginia Wade.
Represented Canadian hockey player Billy Smith.
Represented Canadian hockey player and coach, Al Arbour.
Represented Australian professional golfer Greg Norman.
Represented Mohammad Gulab, an Afghani villager who saved the US Navy Seal Marcus Luttrell.
Represents Rezai Karim, the victim of a stabbing attack by an ISIS loyalist.
Represented Melania Trump—a native of Slovenia and now a United States citizen—and proffered a letter to the media indicating she did not at any point work illegally as a model in the United States.
Represents Janosh Neumann, a former Russian intelligence officer who defected to the United States in 2008.
Represents Sinead O'Connor, an Irish singer-songwriter.
Represented American actress Kelly Rutherford during her international child custody battle with her German ex-husband.

Academic career
In 2007, Wildes began teaching criminal law as an adjunct professor at Bergen Community College in Bergen County, New Jersey. Wildes was mayor of Englewood at the time, and taught in the Division of Business, Math, and Social Sciences at BCC's Paramus campus. In 2011, he became an adjunct professor at Yeshiva University's Benjamin N. Cardozo School of Law.

In November 2015, he produced a continuing legal education course for Lawline.com about how international students can maintain their U.S. status after graduation.

Political career

In 1988, Wildes, then a community activist, auxiliary police officer, and full-time law student, ran for Democratic District Leader of the 28th Assembly District, Part A in New York (which included Forest Hills, Rego Park, Elmhurst, and Maspeth). He was at the time an active member of Community Board 6, and had been nominated for membership in the Local Claims and Adjudication Board of New York State by Governor Mario Cuomo (and was later appointed by President Ronald Reagan).

Wildes has since been appointed by the President of the United States to the District Appeals Board of the Selective Service System for the State of New Jersey and is still a member of the Committee on the Present Danger (alongside former CIA Director, James Woolsey and former U.S. Senator Joseph Lieberman).

Englewood City Council
In early March 1998, local media in northern New Jersey began publishing rumors that Wildes was being urged to run for the Democratic nomination for the 2nd Ward seat on the city council in Englewood, N.J. On Monday, March 16, 1998, the incumbent city councilman, Herb Honig, announced he would not seek reelection to a second term. Wildes announced that he would run for the seat the same day. However, the next day, Honig reversed his decision and decided he would run for reelection.

Local media largely portrayed Honig as the "consummate local politician", and Wildes as the "relative newcomer" in the primary election. The media focused on Wildes' Orthodox Jewish religious affiliation. He named public education, neighborhood beautification, and engaging young people in the political process as his top priority issues.

On March 25, 1998, the media reported that Honig had withdrawn from the city council race. The Englewood Democratic municipal committee voted to back Ellen Singer, a last-minute challenger, for the Democratic nomination on April 1, effectively barring Wildes from the race. The primary was scheduled for June 2. In late April, however, reports that Singer had not been a registered Democrat when she won the municipal committee vote put Wildes back in the race.

On May 20, 1998, the Northern Valley Suburbanite published the transcript of an audio recording of a phone call to Wildes, in which Singer's husband, Scott Singer, threatened Wildes if he did not exit the race. Wildes won the Democratic primary 694–344 on June 2, 1998. Wildes won the general election with no opposition on November 3, 1998.

Wildes was elected president pro tempore of the Englewood city council in 2000. He was the first member of the council to oppose the construction of a Home Depot in Englewood (planned for building in 2000), citing environmental, sanitation, and beautification factors, as well as the local public outcry against the construction retailer. "I listen to my constituents, and their voices are loud and clear against the construction project", Wildes said at the time. He was the only member of the council to support a democratically elected school board, rather than an appointed one. The Suburbanite called him "the most activist [city councilman] in the city's history, giving the impression of never being off duty and never wishing to be off duty." Wildes was reelected to a second term on the city council in 2000.

Congressional testimony
In May 1999, during his first term on the city council, Wildes was asked to testify in front of the United States House Judiciary Subcommittee on Immigration and Border Security (then called the "Subcommittee on Immigration and Claims"). Wildes was invited to testify by Representative Rob Andrews (D-NJ). Andrews was sponsoring a piece of legislation (H.R. 2184) on finding and deporting illegal aliens associated with terrorism, and wanted a legal opinion. Wildes supported the bill, which targeted those who "knowingly aid and abet" individuals who plan or participate in terrorist acts. Wildes said he believed the bill struck an appropriate balance between defending the due process rights of individuals and defending the American public from acts of terrorism.

Mayor of Englewood

In January 2003, the Northern Valley Suburbanite reported that Wildes had raised $60,000 for a "mystery office run."

In February 2003, the media speculated Wildes would run for mayor of Englewood, based on the political fundraisers Wildes had been engaging in since early 2003. Wildes had been raising Englewood's national profile by raising money for Democratic candidates. On Thursday, March 13, 2003, Wildes became the first candidate in the 2003 Englewood mayoral race to announce he was running to succeed Mayor Paul Fader, who had announced he would not be seeking reelection.

On March 19, New Jersey State Senator Byron Baer announced he would run against Wildes for mayor, at the urging of Bergen County Democratic Chairman Joe Ferriero. Englewood's Democratic committee, however, voted against Baer for mayor, and supported Wildes 18–4. On April 3, at a public forum in Englewood, NJ, United States Senator Hillary Rodham Clinton endorsed Wildes for mayor. On April 9 it became clear that Wildes would be unopposed for the Democratic nomination, and was set to face Republican candidate Ray Aspinwall in the November general election.

After another attempt by Englewood Democratic boss Joe Ferriero to push Wildes off the ticket, local media predicted Wildes would easily win the general election due to Englewood's largely Democratic population. Byron Baer, Loretta Weinberg, Gordon Johnson, and several other prominent Englewood democrats backed Wildes for mayor in late September.

Ray Aspinwall, the predicted Republican candidate for mayor, dropped out of the race on October 1 to focus on his job as executive director of the Bergen County Republican Party. Wildes was elected mayor on November 4, 2003.

Wildes was sworn into his first term as mayor on January 1, 2004, by United States Senator Frank Lautenberg and Kadijah Thomas, the 2004 valedictorian of Dwight Morrow High School. Wildes held both of his grandfathers Chumashim (printed Torahs), one inscribed in 1929, at the swearing-in ceremony. The same day, Wildes endorsed a $46.6 million school construction proposal to rebuild and improve public education in Englewood.

The plan, created by Schools Superintendent John Grieco, was described by The Bergen Record as "a 'no-frills' approach toward meeting state health and building codes in school facilities, some of which are 90 years old." Douglas E. Hall, the editor of The Press Journal, wrote an op-ed in his newspaper urging higher voter turnout among Englewood residents to support Grieco's plan. Hall argued that the deterioration of Englewood's public schools had led to a condition of "de facto segregation", and praised Wildes' for supporting the effort to improve the situation. Hall wrote,

The school construction plan was defeated 1,508 to 1,492. The referendum was called "not definitive", however, because of a snow storm that began on voting day and lasted until polls were closed, and because of the slight margin (one half of one percent). Wildes addressed the referendum results, saying "The way I interpret it is that there are residents who came forward wanting to increase their taxes for the good of the community. But we have to look beyond taxes. Investing in a school system is like investing in a portfolio. You hope it will result in increased property values that will make Englewood a more attractive place. If our kids are doing better, it will cost us less in other areas of government. But more than anything this is a moral issue. A society is judged by how we take care of our young." Voters approved the school construction bond at a later referendum.

In his first speech as mayor, Wildes named three issues as his top priorities: "public education, property taxes, and bringing a fresh perspective to government." In his first month in office, Wildes visited several elementary schools and middle schools in Englewood to begin a dialogue with students, as part of his plan to engage more young people in the political process. He talked to students about success and the American dream. At one such event, an elementary school student asked Wildes who his earliest political influence was. Wildes named John F. Kennedy. At another address at Dwight Morrow High School, he told the students, "Never underestimate what being a good person can do for you. People remember the small things. Good morning, how was your day etc. and in return being a good person makes you marketable and appealing." The same month, Wildes met with Cristina Fernández de Kirchner, then First Lady of Argentina.

In February 2004,  Wildes formed a task force to investigate reports by Latino immigrants living in Englewood that they had been targeted for exceedingly intrusive housing inspections. The Bergen Record printed reports of several raids in January 2004 that seemed to specifically target Colombian residents living on West, Charles, and James Streets. At a city council meeting in January, Donald Porrino, an Englewood Zoning officer, had denied targeting any ethnic group, and said inspections were intended to check for overcrowding and other fire safety risks. Wildes responded by saying, "While the city has a sincere interest in averting fires and insuring that people live in hygienic conditions--we still have to insure that people's rights and homes are respected. When it comes to the safety and rights of individuals, an independent review is warranted". Wildes named Remberto Perez chairman of the investigative committee, although Christian Estevez replaced Perez in April. The task force judged raids were "intrusive and bordered on civil rights violations." In March 2004, Wildes ordered a study of Route 4 to check for possible repairs and other improvements to the highway.

In May 2004, he helped the New Jersey Watershed Ambassadors Program, Hackensack Riverkeeper, and the Palisades Learning Center plant 65 trees in Englewood's Crystal Lake Park. That same month he traveled to Jerusalem to attend the 22nd Jerusalem Conference of Mayors. The conference focused on preventing terrorism and training mayors for crisis situations.

During his two terms as mayor of Englewood, Wildes gave keys to the city to several notable recipients. In 2004, Wildes gave a key to the city to Rabbi Seth Mandel, a man whose son was murdered in a 2001 terrorist attack in Israel.

In March 2004, Wildes gave a key to Sheik Abdul Hadi Palazzi for Palazzi's work promoting peace between Muslims and Jews. In January 2005, Wildes gave a key to the American blues singer, B.B. King, who told a crowd in Englewood, "I was happy to meet your handsome young mayor. He seems like a special man, who's going to be around for a long time."

In August 2005, Wildes gave a key to Steve Averbach, a man who was paralyzed after saving dozens of lives in a Jerusalem suicide bombing. In January 2006, Wildes gave a key to artist Ruth Inge Hardison for her sculpture of Martin Luther King Jr. In February 2006, Wildes gave keys to vocalists Tony Bennett and Billy Joel. In 2007, Wildes gave a key to former President Bill Clinton. In 2007 Wildes also gave a key to Salah Uddin Shoaib Choudhury, a Bangladeshi-Muslim journalist who was imprisoned and tortured by the Bangladeshi government for visiting Israel. In May 2009, Wildes gave a key to Englewood Police Department Detective Stephen C. Ford, in recognition of Ford's 25 years of service as an Englewood detective and 21 years of service as a soldier in the United States Army.
2006 Reelection
In July 2006, local media speculated that independent candidate Robert Stern and Republican candidate Baruch "Bruce" Prince would run against Wildes in the 2006 Englewood mayoral race; Wildes was up for reelection. Frank Huttle (the current mayor of Englewood), and Assemblyman Gordon M. Johnson supported Stern for mayor, despite Wildes winning the Democratic primary. Huttle and Johnson wrote campaign literature for Stern and raised funds for his campaign. In a Suburbanite interview of the three candidates, Wildes talked about public education expenditures, maintaining a stable tax base, and reforming the city council as his main priorities for a second term.

On October 19, Englewood City Councilman Kenneth Rosenzweig publicly endorsed Wildes for mayor at a fundraising event. A northjersey.com guide to the 2006 Englewood mayoral election named the Englewood community center, suburban growth, tax relief, and accountability as the biggest issues in the election. Soon after, former President of the United States Bill Clinton recorded a robocall endorsement of Wildes. The recording was broadcast to Englewood residents during the 2006 race. In the call, Clinton said,

Wildes was reelected to a second term on Tuesday, November 7, 2006, with 4,379 votes. Stern garnered 2,325 votes, and Prince finished last with 372 votes. Wildes said he was "invigorated by the resounding support of members of the Englewood community." Wildes was sworn into his second term on January 2, 2007.

In the first week of his second term, Wildes named five new members to the Englewood planning board: Reverend Dr. Vernon Walton, Jordan Comet, Lenore Schiavelli, Leland Robinson, and Warren Finkel. In February 2007, Wildes was named chairman of a New Jersey State League of Municipalities Task Force to study the effect of illegal immigration on municipalities.
Appointment to Governor's Immigration Panel

On Monday, August 6, 2007, Wildes was appointed by New Jersey Governor Jon Corzine to a special Blue Ribbon Advisory Panel on Immigration. The panel, setup by Governor Corzine in response to immigration-focused demonstrations in Morristown, was created to make recommendations on "education, citizenship status, civil rights, fair housing, health care, language proficiency and job training," according to a Newsday article. The panel's 27 members were given 15 months to make recommendations. Wildes said the panel's creation was a necessary, temporary step "while Congress stands silently on the sidelines watching our broken immigration system fester."

Wildes cited his experience as an immigration attorney and mayor of a town with a large immigrant population as qualifications for his appointment to the panel. The panel's April 30, 2009, executive summary report made recommendations about immigrant access to social services, the labor force, education, and state and local government.

In 2008, MSNBC polled 1,000 mayors across the country, including Wildes, to ask what suggestions they had for incoming President-elect Barack Obama. Wildes named comprehensive immigration reform as the most important issue for Obama to focus on in his first term in office. Wildes wrote, "Our new President and Congress must enact comprehensive immigration reform that incorporates an earned legalization, appropriate legal channels for hiring low-skilled workers, and increased employer enforcement and sanctions."

On Tuesday, November 11, 2008, Wildes honored veterans in Englewood at the Liberty Poll on Palisades Avenue. Wildes honored World War II veterans as well as Vietnam, Iraq, and Afghanistan veterans. In his speech at the ceremony, Wildes said, "From the fields at Bunker Hill to the mountains of Afghanistan, our brave young men and women have always battled injustice. As young soldiers continue their missions, we stand among those who have completed theirs and returned home. Today, we pay homage to the glory of their service."

In January 2009, Wildes met with New Jersey Homeland Security officials to discuss community safety. He said he was most concerned about terrorism directed at schools and places of worship. At his fifth State of the City Address, Wildes pledged to "push the limits of what we can do for the fine residents of this city" in his last year in office. Wildes stressed education, taxes, and government as his highest priority issues for the end of his second term.

On January 9, 2009 Wildes swore in Arthur O'Keefe as the new Chief of Police of Englewood. In February 2009, Wildes announced he would not seek a third term as mayor, to become managing partner of Wildes and Weinberg PC.

2012 Congressional Election

In March 2012, Wildes decided to run in New Jersey's newly redrawn 9th congressional district, based in Bergen and Passaic counties. In the Democratic primary, he would have faced U.S. Congressmen Steve Rothman and Bill Pascrell. Local media speculated that Wildes' candidacy would have helped Pascrell win the primary. Wildes ultimately decided not to run and put his support behind Rothman in the Democratic primary.  Rothman lost the election to Pascrell. Wildes has $700,000 on hand.

2018 Mayoral Election
On June 6, 2018, Wildes won the Democratic primary for Mayor of Englewood, defeating his opponent Phil Meisner by a 2-1 margin.

On November 6, 2018, Wildes was elected Mayor of Englewood, winning 84% of the vote in the general election.

Controversial statements
Wildes generated widespread controversy in 2009 when he organized rallies to oppose Libyan President Muammar Gaddafi's visit to New Jersey.

Wildes pressed the U.S. State Department to prevent Gaddafi from staying in a tent on Donald Trump's estate in Englewood during the 2009 United Nations General Assembly meeting in New York City. Wildes said, "I have every problem with a person who admittedly blew up a plane killing 38 New Jersey residents and has the audacity in recent days to give a hero's welcome to a convicted terrorist. To have to remove his rubbish free of charge is insulting." Wildes maintained that the City of Englewood should not have to pay the cost of cleanup and security for the Libyan leader and the opposition protestors.

Philanthropy
Wildes has served on the boards of several major philanthropy organizations and has become well known for his charitable contributions and volunteer work. He served as chair of the American Jewish Congress' Committee on International Terrorism, and was a member of the advisory board for the Urban League of Bergen County.

He is currently a member of the Board of Directors of Boys Town Jerusalem, a Jewish orphanage in Israel. He has been a certified EMT since 1992, and is a volunteer for Hatzoloh, a Jewish emergency medical service in New York, and used to aid the Englewood Volunteer Ambulance Corp (EVAC). He also currently serves on the Board of Directors of WhyHunger, and is a member of the Council of Experts for the Community Security Service (CSS), an organization that protects the American Jewish Community.

He is a member of the Lay Advisory of the New York Board of Rabbis, and is a member of the New York State Bar Association. Wildes is also a member of the Board of Directors of the Manhattan Jewish Experience (MJE), an orthodox Jewish outreach program created by Wildes' brother, Rabbi Mark Wildes, who founded the organization in memory of their late mother, Ruth B. Wildes.

In February 2004, Wildes received the Aleh Foundation Civic Leadership Award for helping Aleh raise funds for developmentally disabled children in Israel. In April 2004, Wildes received the Henry Morgenthau Jr. Distinguished Service Award at the State of Israel Bonds National Dinner of Tribute.

Personal life
Wildes married immigration attorney Amy Messer, in 1990. They met in Wildes' father's immigration class at Cardozo Law School. They live in Englewood, New Jersey, with their four children. Asked about his success in law and politics, Wildes told a student at Janis E. Dismus Middle School in Englewood, "If you are true to yourself, things come out naturally. I am true to myself."

In December 2013, American Airlines saluted Wildes for performing emergency medical services on an elderly woman who had a transient ischemic attack (mini stroke) on an airplane that Wildes was a passenger on. Wildes, who had 20 years of experience as a volunteer EMT, received bonus frequent flier miles from American Airlines for his help.

In September 2018, Wildes released a book about his time as an immigration lawyer. The book, "Safe Haven in America: Battles to Open the Golden Door," was published by the American Bar Association and includes a foreword by Alan Dershowitz. The book has received largely positive reviews from many prominent people including Melania Trump, Rabbi Jonathan Sacks, and Benjamin Brafman, among others.

Works

See also
Leon Wildes
Mayor of Englewood, New Jersey

References

External links

Article about Leon Wildes securing visas for John Lennon and Yoko Ono
1999 Congressional Testimony
2004 Mayoral Swearing-in Address
2005 State of the City Address
2006 State of the City Address
2007 State of the City Address
2009 State of the City Address
Wildes on his book, Safe Haven
Wildes on his family and background

1964 births
Living people
United States Attorneys for the Eastern District of New York
Immigration law scholars
Benjamin N. Cardozo School of Law alumni
Jewish American people in New Jersey politics
Mayors of Englewood, New Jersey
Politicians from Queens, New York
Queens College, City University of New York alumni
21st-century American Jews